Neuaddyrynys is a small village in the  community of Llangynfelyn, Ceredigion, Wales, which is 78.9 miles (127 km) from Cardiff and 178.2 miles (286.7 km) from London. Neuaddyrynys is represented in the Senedd by Elin Jones (Plaid Cymru) and is part of the Ceredigion constituency in the House of Commons.

Etymology
This Welsh name can be translated as meaning "The hall belonging to the island".

References

See also
List of localities in Wales by population

Villages in Ceredigion